The 1991 Boston Marathon was the 95th running of the annual marathon race in Boston, United States, which was held on April 15. The elite men's race was won by Kenya's Ibrahim Hussein in a time of 2:11:06 hours and the women's race was won by Poland's Wanda Panfil in 2:24:18.

A total of 7642 runners finished the race, 6291 men and 1351 women.

Results

Men

Women

References

Results. Association of Road Racing Statisticians. Retrieved 2020-04-14.

External links
 Boston Athletic Association website

Boston Marathon
Boston
Boston Marathon
Marathon
Boston Marathon